Farringdon is a locality in the Queanbeyan–Palerang Regional Council, New South Wales, Australia. It is located about 17 km southwest of Braidwood on the western bank of the Shoalhaven River.

The area now known as Farringdon lies on the traditional lands of the Walbanga people, a group of the Yuin. It was known by early settlers originally as Jinero or Jineroo, a settler rendering of an Aboriginal word. After settler colonisation, the area lay within the Nineteen Counties that were opened to settlement. The name, 'Farringdon' is from an early land grant known as 'Farringdon Park' or just 'Farringdon'. It was by such early land grants that the land in the area was taken from the Walbanga, and what would later be known as native title was extinguished.

Major William Sandys Elrington took up a land grant, known as 'Mount Elrington', in 1827. Elrington had a 29-year military career, including service in the Peninsula War, before selling his commission and migrating to Australia. Elrington sold his land and left Australia for good, in 1846. 

His former home, still known as 'Mount Elrington', is renowned for its historic garden. The garden was begun by Elrington, who brought many of the trees and shrubs from England. Elrington worked his land using convict labour, and his old home retained its small prison, complete with leg irons, until the early 1920s.

Farringdon had a "half-time" school from 1867 to 1894.

References

Localities in New South Wales
Queanbeyan–Palerang Regional Council
Southern Tablelands